Diego Fabián Polenta Musetti (born 6 February 1992) is a Uruguayan footballer who plays as a centre-back for Argentine club Unión Santa Fe.

Polenta has been named in Uruguay's senior team several times, but remains uncapped.

Club career

Early career
Born in Montevideo, Uruguay, Polenta started his career on hometown's club Danubio, in youth categories. His abilities impressed the Italian club Genoa, and he was moved to the club in July 2008.

Genoa C.F.C.
He spent the whole 2009-10 season with the Primavera team. In the 2010-11 season he was included on the first team squad, with the 35 jersey.

On 30 April 2011, he made his first team debut, against Napoli, after came off the bench to replace Giandomenico Mesto.

A.S. Bari
On 29 August 2011, he signed a season-long loan deal with the Serie B club Bari in order to gain first team football experience. After a successful stay that loan deal was extended by one year on 21 August 2012. He stayed with Bari until 2014.

Nacional
In 2014 he joined Uruguayan side Nacional originally on loan, winning the Uruguayan Primera División during 2014–15. Where he won Defensive Player Of The Year award for the Uruguayan Primera División. He won his second title in 2016, with the Nacional winning the 2016 Uruguayan Primera División.

He subsequently became the Captain of Nacional. In July 2017 he won the Torneo Intermedio Final.

In July 2018, with Polenta's contract expiring at Nacional at the end of June 2018, Spanish Newspaper El País, reported that Polenta had received contract offers from Mexican side Club Atlas, Saudi Arabian side Al-Ittihad and English side Leeds United, with the player taking time to consider the proposals.

LA Galaxy
On 7 February 2019, Polenta joined MLS club LA Galaxy. On April 19 he scored his first goal for the club, a late winner against Houston Dynamo.

International career
He has been capped by the Uruguay national under-17 football team for the 2009 FIFA U-17 World Cup and by the Uruguay national under-20 football team for the 2011 South American Youth Championship and for the 2011 FIFA U-20 World Cup, he captained Uruguay at youth level, he was also named by Manager Óscar Tabárez in the Uruguay U23's for the Uruguay Olympic football team at the 2012 Summer Olympics in London, where he played in one game.

He was called up to the Uruguay squad for friendlies against Republic of Ireland  and Estonia. Polenta was named in Uruguay's senior squad for a 2018 FIFA World Cup qualifier against Peru in March 2016.

Style Of Play
Mainly a centre back, he can also operate as a left back.

U20 International goals

|- bgcolor=#DFE7FF
| 1. || 16 January 2011 || Estadio Monumental Virgen de Chapi, Arequipa, Peru ||  || 0–1 || 2–1 || 2011 South American Youth Championship
|- bgcolor=#DFE7FF
| 2. || 22 January 2011 || Estadio Monumental Virgen de Chapi, Arequipa, Peru ||  || 0–4 || 0–4 || 2011 South American Youth Championship
|- bgcolor=#DFE7FF
| 3. || 13 July 2011 || Estadio Juan Antonio Lavalleja, Flores, Uruguay ||  || 2–0 || 2–0 || Friendly
|}

Honours

Nacional
Club
 Uruguayan Primera División: 2014–15
 Uruguayan Primera División: 2016
 2017 Intermedio Final Winner

Individual
 2014–15 Uruguayan Primera División season: Defensive Player Of The Year Award

References

External links

1992 births
Living people
Footballers from Montevideo
Uruguayan footballers
Uruguayan expatriate footballers
Uruguay youth international footballers
Uruguay under-20 international footballers
Uruguay international footballers
Footballers at the 2012 Summer Olympics
Olympic footballers of Uruguay
Association football defenders
Genoa C.F.C. players
S.S.C. Bari players
Club Nacional de Football players
Unión de Santa Fe footballers
Club Olimpia footballers
LA Galaxy players
Uruguayan Primera División players
Paraguayan Primera División players
Argentine Primera División players
Serie A players
Serie B players
Major League Soccer players
Expatriate footballers in Italy
Expatriate soccer players in the United States
Expatriate footballers in Paraguay
Expatriate footballers in Argentina
Uruguayan expatriate sportspeople in Italy
Uruguayan expatriate sportspeople in the United States
Uruguayan expatriate sportspeople in Paraguay
Uruguayan expatriate sportspeople in Argentina
Uruguayan people of Italian descent